In control theory, a time-invariant (TI) system has a time-dependent system function that is not a direct function of time. Such systems are regarded as a class of systems in the field of system analysis. The time-dependent system function is a function of the time-dependent input function. If this function depends only indirectly on the time-domain (via the input function, for example), then that is a system that would be considered time-invariant. Conversely, any direct dependence on the time-domain of the system function could be considered as a "time-varying system".

Mathematically speaking, "time-invariance" of a system is the following property:

Given a system with a time-dependent output function , and a time-dependent input function , the system will be considered time-invariant if a time-delay on the input  directly equates to a time-delay of the output  function. For example, if time  is "elapsed time", then "time-invariance" implies that the relationship between the input function  and the output function  is constant with respect to time 
 

In the language of signal processing, this property can be satisfied if the transfer function of the system is not a direct function of time except as expressed by the input and output.

In the context of a system schematic, this property can also be stated as follows, as shown in the figure to the right:

If a system is time-invariant then the system block commutes with an arbitrary delay.

If a time-invariant system is also linear, it is the subject of linear time-invariant theory (linear time-invariant) with direct applications in NMR spectroscopy, seismology, circuits, signal processing, control theory, and other technical areas. Nonlinear time-invariant systems lack a comprehensive, governing theory. Discrete time-invariant systems are known as shift-invariant systems. Systems which lack the time-invariant property are studied as time-variant systems.

Simple example 

To demonstrate how to determine if a system is time-invariant, consider the two systems:

 System A: 
 System B: 

In contrast, system B's time-dependence is only a function of the time-varying input . This makes system B time-invariant.

The Formal Example below shows in more detail that while System B is a Shift-Invariant System as a function of time, t, System A is not.

Formal example 
A more formal proof of why systems A and B above differ is now presented. To perform this proof, the second definition will be used.

System A: Start with a delay of the input 

Now delay the output by 

Clearly , therefore the system is not time-invariant.

System B: Start with a delay of the input 

Now delay the output by 

Clearly , therefore the system is time-invariant.

More generally, the relationship between the input and output is 

and its variation with time is

For time-invariant systems, the system properties remain constant with time, 

 

Applied to Systems A and B above:

 in general, so it is not time-invariant,
 so it is time-invariant.

Abstract example 

We can denote the shift operator by  where  is the amount by which a vector's index set should be shifted. For example, the "advance-by-1" system

can be represented in this abstract notation by

where  is a function given by

with the system yielding the shifted output

So  is an operator that advances the input vector by 1.

Suppose we represent a system by an operator . This system is time-invariant if it commutes with the shift operator, i.e.,

If our system equation is given by

then it is time-invariant if we can apply the system operator  on  followed by the shift operator , or we can apply the shift operator  followed by the system operator , with the two computations yielding equivalent results.

Applying the system operator first gives

Applying the shift operator first gives

If the system is time-invariant, then

See also 
Finite impulse response
Sheffer sequence
State space (controls)
Signal-flow graph
LTI system theory
Autonomous system (mathematics)

References

Control theory
Signal processing